Thespis (fl. 6th century BC) was an Ancient Greek poet. He was born in the ancient city of Icarius (present-day Dionysos, Greece). According to certain Ancient Greek sources and especially Aristotle, he was the first person ever to appear on stage as an actor playing a character in a play (instead of speaking as themselves).  In other sources, he is said to have introduced the first principal actor in addition to the chorus. He is often called the "Inventor of Tragedy".

Thespis was a singer of dithyrambs (songs about stories from mythology with choric refrains). He is credited with introducing a new style in which one singer or actor performed the words of individual characters in the stories, distinguishing between the characters with the aid of different masks.

This new style was called tragedy, and Thespis was the most popular exponent of it. Eventually, in 534 BC competitions to find the best tragedy were instituted at the City Dionysia in Athens, and Thespis won the first documented competition.  Capitalising on his success, Thespis also invented theatrical touring; he would tour various cities while carrying his costumes, masks and other props in a horse-drawn wagon.

Alleged works
Titles of some plays have been attributed to Thespis. But most modern scholars, following the suggestion of Diogenes Laërtius, consider them to be forgeries, some forged by the philosopher Heraclides Ponticus, others produced rather later, in the Common Era:
Contest of Pelias and Phorbas
Hiereis (Priests)
Hemitheoi (Demigods)
Pentheus

Fragments (probably spurious) in A Nauck, Tragicorum graecorum fragmenta (1887).

Legacy

It is implied that Thespis invented acting in the Western world, and that prior to his performances, no one had ever assumed the resemblance of another person for the purpose of storytelling. In fact, Thespis is the first known actor in written plays. He may thus have had a substantial role in changing the way stories were told and inventing theatre as we know it today. In homage to Thespis, actors in the English-speaking part of the world have been referred to as thespians.

Thespis was the title character in an 1871 comic opera by W.S. Gilbert and Arthur Sullivan, the first collaboration between the two men, although the musical score has mostly been lost. The story involves Thespis and his troupe of actors temporarily replacing the gods of Olympus, while the latter come down to earth to "mingle" with humanity.  The actors do a bad job of it, and the gods return angrily to resume their rightful roles.

A branch of the National Theatre of Greece expressly instituted in 1939 to tour the country is named "The Wagon of Thespis" (Greek: Άρμα Θέσπιδος, Árma Théspidos) in his honour.

See also
Aeschylus
Aristophanes
Aristotle
Dionysia
Euripides
 International Thespian Society
Phrynichus
Solon
Sophocles

References

Sources
 Gaster, Theodor, H., Thespis: Ritual, Myth, and Drama in the Ancient Near East, Henry Schuman Publishing, New York, 1950. .

Ancient Greek actors
Greek male stage actors
History of theatre
6th-century BC Athenians
Tragic poets
Year of birth unknown